The Mujavir are a Muslim community found in the state of Uttar Pradesh in India.  They are also known as Shaikh Hashemi Or Sheikh Masudi.

Origin 

The word mujavir literally means caretakers, and the Mujavir are the caretakers of the shrine of the famous Sufi, Saiyid Salar Masood in Bahraich. They claim that their ancestors came from Iraq, and were appointed custodians of the shrine. The Mujavir speak Urdu among themselves and Hindi with outsiders.

Present circumstances 

Their traditional occupation as the custodians of the shrine is now limited to few members of the community. Most Mujavir are now employed as Engineers, Doctors, Self Employee, Small Scale Businesses, carpenters, rickshaw pullers and daily wage labourers. They reside in their own quarters in the city of Bahraich And All over UttarPradesh or National Capital Delhi. Specially they live in West UttarPradesh (Bareilly, Muradabaad, Gaziabaad,).  The Mujavir are endogamous, and only marry within the community. There are, however, some cases of intermarriage with other Shaikh groups.

See also 

Shaikh of Uttar Pradesh

References 

Social groups of Uttar Pradesh
Muslim communities of Uttar Pradesh
Muslim communities of India
Shaikh clans